Talysh assimilation is a socio-cultural process in the Republic of Azerbaijan (and its predecessor, the Azerbaijan SSR of the Soviet Union) in which the Talysh cease to identify themselves as part of the Talysh ethnic and cultural community. Assimilation proceeds through identification with culture, religion, national or political ideals of the assimilating environment or through mixed marriages.

Assimilation 
The influence of ethnic processes, primarily the process of natural assimilation, on the change in the ethnic composition of the population was even more significant than in the previous period. The assimilation by Azerbaijanis of the peoples of the Shahdagh group, Tats, Talysh and others contributed to an increase in the absolute number of Azerbaijanis and their share in the entire population of the republic. Thus, in the 1959 census and subsequent censuses, the Talysh named Azeri as their native language, and themselves Azeris. However, part of the Talysh continued to consider Talysh their native language.
According to the 1897 census, 35,219 Talysh lived in the Russian Empire, and according to the 1926 census, there were 77,039 Talysh in the Azerbaijan SSR. From 1959 to 1989, the Talysh were not included in any censuses as a separate ethnic group, but were considered part of the Azerbaijani Turks, although the Talysh speak Iranian. In 1999, the Azerbaijani government stated that there were only 76,800 Talysh in the Republic of Azerbaijan, but this is considered below the actual number given problems with registration as Talysh. Some argue that the number of Talysh people inhabiting the southern regions of Azerbaijan is 500,000. According to the Talysh cultural center in Lankaran, in Masalliy there are 60% of Talysh people, in Lankaran only 2 villages are Turkic, Astara is completely Talysh, in Lerik only 2 villages are also Turkic. Obtaining accurate statistics is difficult due to the lack of reliable sources, mixed marriages and the decline in knowledge of the Talysh language. Although oppressed by poverty, unemployment, lack of basic infrastructure such as electricity, the Talysh have a high birth rate and thus their share in the Azerbaijani population will grow. These problems, combined with fear of reprisals and perceptions of collusion between the Talysh and Armenia, in many respects affirm the Talysh in their ethnic identity and nationalism.  International organizations such as Washington Profile, the Unrepresented Nations and Peoples Organization  and Radio Free Europe / Radio Liberty have expressed concern over the arrest of Novruzali Mammadov, chairman of the Talish Cultural Center and chief editor of the newspaper "Tolyshi Sado". He was arrested and sentenced to 10 years on charges of high treason after his newspaper published articles claiming that the poet Nizami and the leader of the anti-Arab uprising Bābak Khorramdin were Talysh (and not Azerbaijanis, as officially considered in Azerbaijan). The report of the "European Commission against Racism and Intolerance" (ECRI) noted that against the background of the cultivation of anti-Armenian sentiments in Azerbaijan, serious concerns are also expressed in connection with incitement of hatred towards the Talysh minority. ECRI notes with concern cases of abuse of legislation against members of minorities. This is how the former editor-in-chief of the only Talish-language newspaper "Tolyshi Sado", human rights activist Hilal Mammadov, was arrested and charged with drug possession. During his arrest, he was beaten and insulted on ethnic grounds. Hilal Mammadov was taken into custody after he posted a video about Talysh culture on the Internet, which received more than 20 million views. Leyla Yunus described his arrest as an example of pressure on representatives of national minorities. Earlier, the previous editor of the same Talysh newspaper, Novruzalli Mammadov, was arrested and died in prison.

In the Azerbaijan SSR 
Viktor Kozlov in his book entitled “Nationalities of the USSR” writes: “In the Azerbaijan SSR, Azerbaijanis quite compactly settled the territory of the republic, except for the Nagorno-Karabakh Autonomous Region, where Armenians lived (significant groups of Armenians also live in other regions of the republic, especially in cities) and some northern regions where Lezgins, Tats and others live among Azerbaijanis. nationality. In the southeast of the republic, the Iranian-speaking Talysh (in 1926, over 80 thousand people) gradually merged with the Azerbaijanis. From 1926 to 1939, there was a spill-over increase in the number of Russians in the republic, who arrived mainly in the oil fields and industrial enterprises of the Baku region. However, from 1939 to 1959 there was a slight decrease in the Russian population, in 1959-1970. its growth was not significant, and by 1979 the number of Russians decreased again. The number of Armenians, some of whom migrated to Armenia, also grew at a slower pace, while the number of Azerbaijanis rapidly increased as a result of the higher natural increase and assimilation of some ethnic minorities, in particular the Talysh. Therefore, their share in the total population of the republic from 1939 to 1979 increased by almost 20%.Analyzing the data of the 1959 census, S.Bruk and V.Kozlov (they are included in the composition of a people that differs from them in language and culture), nor by assimilation, for such a strong and rapid development of which there were no sufficient objective reasons. Assimilation usually begins with a change of language, and meanwhile, the Pamir peoples and a significant part of the Talysh, even according to the 1959 census, retained their native languages.

According to Vladimir Belikov, Azerbaijan has taken a course towards assimilation of all national minorities, except for Armenians, Russians, Jews. The Talysh and Kurdish national regions ceased to exist,publications in these languages were discontinued.Talysh, who constituted the absolute majority in the region Lankaran (in 1926 there were 77 thousand people), without receiving an official acknowledgment in the early 1920s, later subjected to severe discrimination. The number of Talysh people in Azerbaijan decreased in 1926-1989. three and a half times, Kurds more than two times.

Talysh identity was intensely suppressed during Soviet times. At the beginning of the Soviet period, there were Talysh secondary schools, a newspaper called Red Talysh, and books in Talysh. After the plenum of the Central Committee, held on June 6, 1937, on the eve of the XIII Congress of the Communist Party of Azerbaijan, where the issue of the content of the forthcoming report of the Central Committee to the Congress was discussed, the question of the purification of the Azerbaijani language was raised among others. One of the participants in the discussion spoke about the need to "purify the Tats language." To which Mir Jafar Bagirov said - “I think it's time to move from the Tat, Kurdish, Talysh languages to the Azerbaijani language. The People's Commissariat for Education should take the initiative, they are all Azerbaijanis".

After this plenum, a decision was made to stop teaching in other languages and switch to the Azerbaijani language, schools in Talysh were closed, periodicals were stopped, and Talysh scientists and public figures (Ahmadzadeh Z., Nasirli M., etc.) were subjected to repression. As  Boris Miller points out, "the small practical usefulness of this undertaking for the Talysh themselves has become clear".  However, this does not explain such brutal repressions against the entire Talysh intelligentsia of that period. Since then, Talysh identity has ceased to be reflected in official statistics, Talysh were ordered to identify themselves with Azerbaijanis.

Present time 
Historical suppression of identity and inability to practice their culture and language instilled self-censorship in the Talysh. This makes it difficult to assess support for any kind of Talysh movement. According to Hema Kotecha, many Talysh fears that they will be considered linked to the separatist Talysh-Mugan Autonomous Republic, Russia or Armenia if they speak out openly and try to speak out about their beliefs in the public sphere. One case of the current repressions, when a school in Lerik wanted to invite a poet from Lankaran to meet with the children: the director was told that in this case he would be fired. Fear of the police is another reason for this silence, although support for secular democracy and shared Azeri-Talysh feelings about Nagorno-Karabakh also contribute to this.

In November 1990, the Republican Center of Talysh Culture was established under the Azerbaijan Culture Fund, which is designed to promote the research, development and revival of history, original culture, traditions and customs of the Talysh. There is a folklore ensemble Babushka from the village of Separadi, Lankaran region, performing folk songs and bayats in the Azerbaijani and Talysh languages. The culture and way of life of the Talysh people are very close to the Azerbaijani one.  

In 2003, by order of the Ministry of Education of Azerbaijan, curricula were approved for grades 1-4 of secondary school in several languages of the peoples of Azerbaijan, including Talysh.  From 1992 to 2011, the newspaper "Tolyshi Sado" (Voice of Talysh) was periodically published in Azerbaijan, the newspaper was published at the own expense of the newspaper editors, but after the death of the editor-in-chief Novruzali Mammadov in an Azerbaijani prison, radio broadcasts are broadcast on Talysh language.

According to Vladimir Dergachev, the geopolitical position of the Caucasus has changed in the post-Soviet space, where the ethno-national and ethno-confessional "volcano" woke up (Sumgait, Nagorny Karabakh, Chechnya, Dagestan, Abkhazia, Ossetia, Karachay-Cherkessia). Separatist sentiments were especially evident in the conflicts in Abkhazia and North Ossetia.In addition to the Karabakh conflict, in Azerbaijan note discrimination against Iranian-speaking peoples - Talysh and Kurds.

Notes 

Talysh people
Cultural assimilation
Language policy in Russia
Ethnicity in politics
Azerbaijan Soviet Socialist Republic
Politics of Azerbaijan
Human rights in Azerbaijan